Phonk is a subgenre of hip hop and trap music directly inspired by 1990s Memphis rap. Mostly present on the SoundCloud platform, the music is characterized by vocals from old Memphis rap tapes and samples from early-1990s hip hop, often combining them with elements of jazz and funk. The genre deploys distorting techniques such as chopped and screwed to create a darker sound.

Initially developed in the 2000s in the Southern United States, mainly in Houston and Memphis, the genre's early pioneers include DJ Screw, X-Raided, DJ Spanish Fly, DJ Squeeky, and the collective Three 6 Mafia. In the late-2010s, through streaming platforms such as SoundCloud, the genre developed more of an emphasis on jazz and classic hip hop.

Popularized by TikTok and the drift community in social media, "drift phonk" is a subgenre of phonk which emerged in Russia in the late-2010s; its main features are the use of cowbells and high bass. It is generally used in lo-fi videos showing drifting cars. With the rise in popularity of drift phonk, the word "phonk" started to become more associated to the subgenre as opposed to the original genre.

History 
Phonk took inspiration from trap roots in the Southern United States in the mid 1990s. Artists or musical groups like DJ Screw, X-Raided, DJ Spanish Fly, DJ Squeeky, and the collective Three 6 Mafia all helped pioneer the foundations for the genre to emerge many years later, with the Houston chopped and screwed seen as the precursor to the genre. While phonk died down at the end of the 2000s, it saw a resurgence in the early 2010s, thanks to artists such as SpaceGhostPurrp.

The word "phonk" was popularized by SpaceGhostPurrp, who released tracks such as "Pheel tha Phonk", "Bringin' tha Phonk", and "Keep Bringin' tha Phonk". In an interview, he explained that "phonk is slang for funk", in reference to the G-funk music genre. YouTube channels such as Ryan Celsius also helped popularize the genre. Phonk producers continued to push this sound in the underground, before the genre gained real momentum during the mid-2010s.

By the end of 2017, phonk had shifted away from the "gritty, dark, Memphis-oriented sound", incorporating more modern vocals, with elements of jazz and classic hip hop. This stream of phonk has been described as "rare phonk" by Celsius, characterized by "more of a cleaner, almost mainstream trap sound". Between 2016 and 2018, phonk was one of the most listened genres on SoundCloud, with the hashtag #phonk among the most trending each year.

Characteristics 
Directly inspired by 1990s Memphis rap, phonk is characterized by old Memphis rap vocals and samples from early-1990s hip hop. These are often combined with jazz and funk samples. The chopped and screwed technique is mainly used, in order to create a darker sound.

A peculiarity of phonk is the fact that it is not anchored to a regional "scene": it is tied to SoundCloud itself as an online platform, which highlights subgenres derived from hip hop and experimental pop. Other notable artists associated with "new-age phonk" include DJ Smokey, DJ Yung Vamp, Soudiere, and Mythic.

Alongside its musical aspect, phonk is characterized by a distinguishable aesthetic incorporating cartoon imagery including fan-art of The Simpsons. Phonk artists often use "Pen & Pixel"-style graphics for their EPs and albums.

Drift phonk 
"Drift phonk", a subgenre of phonk, emerged in the late-2010s in Russia. It is characterized by the use of high bass, cowbells and distorted sounds, making the lyrics of the samples often unrecognizable. The tempo of drift phonk tracks is also high. Drift phonk videos often use clips of drifting and street racing cars, which makes it popular in online car culture. The genre quickly gained traction through the app TikTok in 2020. Most of the prominent drift phonk producers come from Russia. The pioneers of the genre are considered to be such performers as Ghostface Playa, Pharmacist, Prxsxnt Fxture, Dvrst, Kaito Shoma and Ya$h.

As drift phonk became popular on TikTok, it became more mainstream than the original genre; this, in turn, made the word "phonk" become more associated with the drift phonk subgenre. Following the rise in popularity of the genre in Russia, Spotify released their official curated phonk playlist in May 2021, which was almost exclusively composed of drift phonk songs.

References

Phonk
Hip hop genres
Trap music
21st-century music genres
2000s in music
2010s in music
2020s in music